Marie-Claude Nichols (born December 5, 1973) is a Canadian politician born in Terrebonne, Quebec. Nichols was elected to the National Assembly of Quebec in the 2014 election. She represents the electoral district of Vaudreuil.

Initially elected as liberal, she was expelled by party leader Dominique Anglade shortly after the 2022 election, on October 27, 2022. Prior to her election to the legislature, Nichols was the mayor of Notre-Dame-de-l'Île-Perrot.

References

1973 births
Living people
French Quebecers
Mayors of places in Quebec
People from Terrebonne, Quebec
Quebec Liberal Party MNAs
Independent MNAs in Quebec
Women mayors of places in Quebec
Women MNAs in Quebec
21st-century Canadian politicians
21st-century Canadian women politicians